Mir Sayyed Muhammad Marashi (June 1714May 1763), better known by his dynastic name of Suleiman II, was a Safavid pretender who managed to briefly become ruler of some parts of Iran from 1749 to 1750. He was in charge of the affairs of the Imam Reza shrine in Mashhad.

The young Shahrokh was enthroned at Mashhad in October 1748 by Iranian nobles. Two months later Ibrahim proclaimed himself shah; but he was defeated and fled. Sayyid Muhammad refused to admit him to the shrine city of Mashad. Sayyid Mohammad's mother was the daughter of Safavid shah Suleiman I, and so in 1750 he was enthroned by Mir Alam Khan Khuzaima and some Kurdish and Jalayirid chiefs as Suleiman II. Shahrokh was blinded but was restored to the throne after only a few months, as Suleiman II was removed and blinded.

Ancestry

Sources 
 

Safavid princes
1750 deaths
Year of birth unknown
18th-century monarchs of Persia
Khalifeh family